Ilse Heylen (born 21 March 1977, Edegem) is a Belgian judoka. She won the bronze medal at the 2004 Summer Olympics in Athens, Greece.

At the 2004 Summer Olympics in Athens, Heylen competed in the Half-lightweight (52 kg). She won her first two bouts against Madagascar's Naina Ravaoarisoa and Kazakhstan's Sholpan Kaliyeva before losing to Cuba's Amarilis Savón, the eventual bronze medal winner, she advanced to the repechage however. She won all of her repechage bouts over Sanna Askelöf of Sweden and Georgina Singleton of Great Britain before winning her bronze medal bout over France's Annabelle Euranie.

Heylen also became the 2005 European Champion (in Rotterdam) and won a silver medal in 2004 and a bronze medal at the 2006, 2007, 2009 and 2010 European Championships in Belgrade.

She also competed at the 2008 and 2012 Summer Olympics. At the 2012 Summer Olympics, she reached the semi-finals, where she was defeated by the eventual silver medalist, Yanet Bermoy.

References

External links

 
 

1977 births
Living people
Belgian female judoka
Olympic judoka of Belgium
Judoka at the 2004 Summer Olympics
Judoka at the 2008 Summer Olympics
Judoka at the 2012 Summer Olympics
Olympic bronze medalists for Belgium
Olympic medalists in judo
People from Edegem
Medalists at the 2004 Summer Olympics
Universiade medalists in judo
Universiade bronze medalists for Belgium
European Games competitors for Belgium
Judoka at the 2015 European Games
Medalists at the 1999 Summer Universiade
Sportspeople from Antwerp Province